PartyWith was a mobile application for iOS and Android. It was a free app with the aim of connecting people who want to party. It changed its name from Party with a Local to PartyWith in October 2017 to better reflect all its use cases. As of October 2021 the web site is offline and the app can't be found in the Android or iPhone stores.

Description 
The application combined GPS location information with a social networking framework, providing PartyWith users with the opportunity to chat to and meet other users. The application also recommended events for users to go to, based on a crowd-sourced model. Users must be over the age of 18.

Platforms 
PartyWith was available for iOS through the iTunes app store and Android through the Play Store

References

Geosocial networking